The 2007–08 Liga IV was the 66th season of the Liga IV, the fourth tier of the Romanian football league system. The champions of each county association play against one from a neighboring county in a play-off match played on a neutral venue. The winners of the play-off matches promoted to Liga III.

Promotion play-off 
The matches was scheduled to be played on 31 May 2008.

|}

County leagues

Arad County

Argeș County

Bacău County

Bihor County

Brăila County

Bucharest 
Final

Progresul București II won the 2007–08 Liga IV Bucharest and qualify to promotion play-off in Liga III.

Caraș-Severin County

Cluj County

Covasna County

Galați County

Mureș County

Neamț County

Sălaj County

Suceava County

Vâlcea County

See also 
 2007–08 Liga I
 2007–08 Liga II
 2007–08 Liga III

References

External links
 FRF

Liga IV seasons
4
Romania